The  Oakland Raiders season was the franchise's 46th season in the National Football League, the 56th overall, the 21st of their second stint in Oakland, and the first under new head coach Jack Del Rio. Coming off a 3–13 season the prior year, the Raiders improved to 7–9 on the season. Despite their improvement, the Raiders were eliminated from playoff contention in Week 15 with a loss to the Green Bay Packers at home. They once again failed to finish with a winning record, not having done so since 2002. This meant that the Raiders were the only team from 2003 to this year that did not have a single winning season. 

.

Notable players acquired

2015 draft class

Staff

Roster

Schedule

Preseason

Regular season

Note: Intra-division opponents are in bold text.

Game summaries

Week 1: vs. Cincinnati Bengals

The Bengals jumped on the Raiders early and often, leading 24–0 at the half. Derek Carr left the game in the first half with an injury to his throwing hand, which resulted in Matt McGloin taking over. The Raiders mustered two touchdowns in the fourth quarter, but it was too little too late, losing the game 33–13 to start their season 0–1. The loss marked the first ever loss by the Raiders to the Bengals at home (10–1).

Week 2: vs. Baltimore Ravens

A high-scoring first half, highlighted by Amari Cooper's 68-yard touchdown catch resulted in a 20–20 tie at halftime. A field goal and touchdown catch by Michael Crabtree put the Raiders up 10 going in the fourth quarter. However, Baltimore stormed back with 13 points to take the lead. A late interception thrown by Derek Carr appeared to be the end, but with 30 seconds left in regulation, Carr threw a touchdown pass to Seth Roberts to take the lead. With the win, the Raiders improved to 1–1 on the season and 2–7 all-time against the Ravens.

Week 3: at Cleveland Browns

The Raiders jumped out early on the Browns with two touchdown passes by Carr in the first half. A Latavius Murray touchdown run early in the fourth quarter seemed to seal it for the Raiders. However, the Browns made a comeback late, but Charles Woodson intercepted Josh McCown's pass in the final minute to seal the win. The Raiders snapped an 11-game road losing streak with the win and improved to 2–1 on the season.

Week 4 at Bears

Two first-half touchdown passes by Carr gave the Raiders a one-point lead at the half. The teams exchanged field goals in the second half. Following a late Jay Cutler interception, the Raiders took a late lead on a Sebastian Janikowski field goal with just over two minutes remaining. However, the Bears stormed down the field, and Robbie Gould hit a 49-yard field goal with two seconds remaining to seal the win. With the loss, the Raiders dropped to 2–2 on the season.

Week 5: vs. Denver Broncos 

Charles Woodson said days prior to Week 5 that he always wanted to intercept a pass from Peyton Manning as he had not accomplished this feat in his entire 18-year career. He lived up to his word, intercepting Manning twice, but it was Carr's interception and the resulting return for a touchdown by Chris Harris that was the difference in the game. The Raiders fell to the Broncos 16–10 as the team dropped to 2–3 going into their bye week.

Week 6: BYE WEEK

Week 7: at San Diego Chargers

The Raiders jumped out to an early lead on the Chargers scoring on their first seven possessions. Three Janikowski field goals and two Carr touchdown passes led the way to a 30–6 lead at the half. The Chargers attempted a comeback in the fourth quarter, but it was too little too late as the Raiders won 37–29. With the win, the Raiders improved to 3–3 on the season.

Week 8: vs. New York Jets

Carr threw four touchdown passes, three in the first half, and totaled 333 yard passing against the Jets' highly ranked defense. The Raiders took a 21–6 lead half time. Murray added 113 yards on the ground as the Raiders won easily 34–20. With the win, the Raiders improved to 4–3, marking the first time since 2011 the Raiders had a winning record this late in the season.

Week 9: at Pittsburgh Steelers

Carr threw for 301 yards with four touchdowns and one interception and Murray ran for 96 yards before leaving with concussion-like symptoms. But, the Raiders defense could not stop Antonio Brown and DeAngelo Williams. The two Steelers combined for 531 total yards. Despite Ben Roethlisberger leaving the game in the fourth quarter with a foot injury, the Steelers could not be stopped. Williams led the Steelers to the Raiders one-yard line before the winning field goal sailed through the uprights as time expired. With the loss, the Raiders dropped to 4–4 on the season.

Week 10: vs. Minnesota Vikings
Minnesota paid a visit to Oakland for Week 10. Adrian Peterson tied a record for most 200-yard rushing games by rushing for 203 yards against the Raiders beleaguered rush defense. Derek Carr threw two touchdown passes, but also two interceptions. Peterson's 80 yard touchdown run with less than two minutes remaining sealed the victory for the Vikings. The Raiders fell to 4–5 on the season.

Week 11: at Detroit Lions
Looking to avoid a season-high three-game losing streak, the Raiders visited Detroit to face the 2–7 Lions. A defensive struggle in the first half led to three Detroit field goals and 9–0 deficit for Oakland. The Raiders came alive in third quarter, scoring 13 points on two Janikowski field goals and a Murray touchdown run. However, the Lions scored late on a Matthew Stafford touchdown run and the Raiders fell to 4–6.

Week 12: at Tennessee Titans

The Raiders started well in Tennessee, taking a 13–6 lead at halftime over the Titans on a touchdown pass from Carr to Crabtree. The Raiders jumped out early in the third quarter on touchdown pass to Roberts. However, the Titans rallied scoring 15 points on two Marcus Mariota touchdown passes. Oakland drove late in the game looking for the winning score and appeared to have been stopped on an incomplete pass in the end zone on fourth down. However, the Titans were called for holding and Carr hit Roberts for the game-clinching touchdown two play later. The Raiders halted their three-game losing streak and moved to 5–6 on the season.

Week 13: vs. Kansas City Chiefs
With the loss, the Raiders fell to 5-7.

Week 14: at Denver Broncos

Khalil Mack tied the Oakland Raiders franchise record for most sacks in a game with 5 sacks in the Raiders' hard-fought 15-12 victory over the Broncos at Mile High.  It also snapped their 8-game losing streak to the Broncos.

Week 15: vs. Green Bay Packers
With the loss, the Raiders fell to 6-8 and were officially eliminated from playoff contention for the 14th straight year. The Raiders also finished 0-4 against the NFC North.

Week 16: vs. San Diego Chargers

In Charles Woodson's last game at the Coliseum, the game was hard-fought and the Raiders won 23-20 in an overtime thriller in order to go to 7-8 in what could be their final game in Oakland. Woodson addressed to Oakland's home crowd after the game saying, "I will never leave you".

Week 17: at Kansas City Chiefs

This was Charles Woodson's last game in the NFL. With the loss, the Raiders ended their season 7-9 and clinched their 14th straight losing season.

Standings

Division

Conference

References

External links
 

Oakland
Oakland Raiders seasons
R00
Oakland Raiders